Nationality words link to articles with information on the nation's poetry or literature (for instance, Irish or France).

Events

Works published

920:
 Waltharius, a Latin poem founded on German popular tradition, which relates the exploits of the west Gothic hero Walter of Aquitaine

Births
Death years link to the corresponding "[year] in poetry" article. There are conflicting or unreliable sources for the birth years of many people born in this period; where sources conflict, the poet is listed again and the conflict is noted:

920:
 Dunash ben Labrat (died 990), Jewish poet in Al-Andalus

921:
 Ōnakatomi no Yoshinobu (died 991), one of the Thirty-six Poetry Immortals of Japan

923:
 Fujiwara no Nakafumi (died 992), one of the Thirty-six Poetry Immortals of Japan

925:
 Ferdowsi حکیم ابوالقاسم فردوسی توسی (died 1020), Persian

929:
 Kishi Joō (died 985), one of the Thirty-six Poetry Immortals and an early Japanese woman poet

Deaths
Birth years link to the corresponding "[year] in poetry" article:

920:
 Mibu no Tadamine (born unknown), Japanese waka poet

922:
 March 26: Mansur Al-Hallaj (born 858), Persian mystic, revolutionary writer, poet and pious teacher of Sufism; most famous for his apparent, but disputed, self-proclaimed divinity
 Oshikochi Mitsune (born 898), Japanese waka poet and one of the Thirty-six Poetry Immortals

925:
 Vasugupta (born 860), writer of the Shiva Sutras of Vasugupta

See also

 Poetry
 10th century in poetry
 10th century in literature
 List of years in poetry

Other events:
 Other events of the 12th century
 Other events of the 13th century

10th century:
 10th century in poetry
 10th century in literature

Notes

10th-century poetry
Poetry